Rathymus is a genus of beetles in the family Carabidae, containing the following species:

 Rathymus carbonarius Dejean, 1831
 Rathymus melanarius Klug, 1853
 Rathymus saganicola (G. Muller, 1941)

References

Orthogoniinae